The 109th Massachusetts General Court, consisting of the Massachusetts Senate and the Massachusetts House of Representatives, met in 1888 during the governorship of Oliver Ames. Halsey J. Boardman served as president of the Senate and Charles J. Noyes served as speaker of the House.

Notable legislation included incorporation of the Massachusetts chapter of the National Woman Suffrage Association.

Senators

Representatives

See also
 Massachusetts Ballot Act
 50th United States Congress
 List of Massachusetts General Courts

References

Further reading

External links
 
 

Political history of Massachusetts
Massachusetts legislative sessions
massachusetts
1888 in Massachusetts